The 2020–21 Sporting de Gijón season was the club's 115th season in existence and the club's fourth consecutive season in the second division of Spanish football. In addition to the domestic league, Sporting Gijón participated in this season's edition of the Copa del Rey. The season covered the period from 21 July 2020 to 30 June 2021.

Players

First-team squad
.

Reserve team

Out on loan

Transfers

In

|}

Out

|}

Pre-season and friendlies

Competitions

Overview

Segunda División

League table

Results summary

Results by round

Matches
The league fixtures were announced on 31 August 2020.

Copa del Rey

Statistics

Appearances and goals
Last updated 14 March 2020.

|-
! colspan=14 style=background:#dcdcdc; text-align:center|Goalkeepers

|-
! colspan=14 style=background:#dcdcdc; text-align:center|Defenders

|-
! colspan=14 style=background:#dcdcdc; text-align:center|Midfielders

|-
! colspan=14 style=background:#dcdcdc; text-align:center|Forwards

|-
! colspan=14 style=background:#dcdcdc; text-align:center| Players who have made an appearance or had a squad number this season but have left the club

|}

Goalscorers

Notes

References

External links

Sporting de Gijón seasons
Sporting Gijón